Sir Thomas Aston Clifford-Constable, 2nd Baronet (3 May 1807 – 22 December 1870) was a British landowner and Member of Parliament.

Life 
He was born in 1807. He the only son of Mary Macdonald and Sir Thomas Hugh Clifford-Constable, 1st Baronet of Tixall, Staffordshire who he succeeded in 1823. His elder sister was the diarist Mary Barbara Clifford. The family had descended from the Barons Clifford and had adopted the Constable name on inheriting the Burton Constable estate near Hull. On his coming of age in 1828 Thomas inherited not only Tixall Hall, the family seat, but also Burton Constable Hall and an estate at Wycliffe, County Durham. He moved the family seat to Burton Constable and sold Tixall Hall to Earl Talbot in 1835.

He represented the rotten borough of Hedon as Member of Parliament from 1830 to 1832 and was appointed high Sheriff of Yorkshire for 1840–41.

He died a wealthy man in December 1870. He had married twice: firstly Marianne, the daughter of Charles Joseph Chichester of Calverleigh Court, Devon, with whom he had a son and secondly Rosina, the daughter of Charles Brandon. He was succeeded by his only son Frederick Augustus Talbot Constable (1828–94).

References

External links 
 

1807 births
1870 deaths
Members of the Parliament of the United Kingdom for English constituencies
UK MPs 1830–1831
UK MPs 1831–1832
High Sheriffs of Yorkshire
Baronets in the Baronetage of the United Kingdom
People from Holderness